Plumas (Spanish for "feathers") may refer to:

Places
Canada
Plumas, Manitoba
Plumas station

Mexico
Santiago Ihuitlán Plumas

United States
Plumas County, California
Plumas National Forest
Plumas Lake, California

Other uses
USS Plumas County, American tank landing ship

See also
Pluma (disambiguation)